TNA 2nd Anniversary Show (also known as Slammiversary (2004)) was a professional wrestling pay-per-view event produced by Total Nonstop Action Wrestling (TNA), which took place on June 23, 2004 at the TNA Asylum in Nashville, Tennessee. The event succeeded the promotion's first anniversary show and celebrated the second anniversary of TNA's first event held on June 19, 2002.

Nine matches were contested at the event, with six airing live on the pay-per-view. The event featured three championship matches including the main event, where Jeff Jarrett retained the NWA World Heavyweight Championship against Ron Killings after the match ended in a no contest. Also at the event, AJ Styles retained the X Division Championship against the debuting Jeff Hardy after the match ended in a no contest and America's Most Wanted (Chris Harris and James Storm) retained the NWA World Tag Team Championship against Miyamoto and Nosawa.

Production

Storylines
On June 2, Ron Killings lost the NWA World Heavyweight Championship in the first-ever King of the Mountain match to Jeff Jarrett, also involving AJ Styles, Chris Harris and Raven. On June 9, Jarrett competed against all three members of Killings' faction 3Live Kru, defeating Konnan in a strap match and BG James in a Trailer Park Trash match but lost to Killings in a Ghetto Justice match. On the June 11 episode of Impact!, Dusty Rhodes announced that Jarrett would defend the title against Killings at the 2nd Anniversary Show. On the June 18 episode of Impact!, Vince Russo added a stipulation into the match that if Jarrett got disqualified then he would lose the title.

Results

References

2004 in professional wrestling
June 2004 sports events in the United States
2004 in Tennessee
Professional wrestling in Nashville, Tennessee
2004 Total Nonstop Action Wrestling pay-per-view events
Slammiversary